Bruce M. Keyter is a South African professional golfer.

Keyter won the Natal Open as an amateur in 1954. He turned professional soon after winning the 1955 South African Amateur Championship. He began his career as an assistant professional at Royal Durban Country Club. His first victory was at the 1956 Transvaal Open where he defeated South African legend Bobby Locke by a shot. It was a surprising victory; Australia's The Argus noted that it was Locke's first defeat in a big South African tournament in 20 years. Two months later, in April, Keyter was runner-up to Gary Player in the South African Open. A year later, in 1957, he won the Natal Open.

In 1963 Keyter won what was arguably the biggest win of his career at the South African Masters, a triple crown event. He shot 291 (−9) to win by three over Terry Westbrook, Harold Inggs, and Eric Moore. In December he was runner-up in the South African Open for the second time, two strokes behind Allan Henning.

Amateur wins 
1955 South African Amateur

Professional wins (4) 
1954 Natal Open (as an amateur)
1956 Transvaal Open
1957 Natal Open
1963 South African Masters

References 

South African male golfers